HMS Speedwell was a fireship of the 1689 Programme built under contract. She would be rebuilt and rerated several times from a fireship to a 24-gun Fifth rate then reduced to a 20-gun sixth rate and finally a bomb ketch. She was at the Battle of Barfleur in 1692 and had an attempted mutiny in 1699. After her first rebuild she was employed in the Irish Sea capturing four privateers and recapturing a sloop. She was wrecked on the Dutch coast in 1720.

Speedwell was the fifth named vessel since it was used for a Galley captured from the French in the Firth of Forth in January 1560 and broken in 1580.

Construction
She was ordered on 6 December 1689 to be constructed under contract by Thomas Gressingham of 'Redrith' (Rotherhithe). Terms of the awarded on 18 December 1689 was the vessel would cost £7.2.6d per ton. She was launched on 3 April 1690. The tonnage calculation would be  tons The gun armament would be eight 6-pounder guns mounted on wooden trucks.

Commissioned Service
She was commissioned on 4 April 1690 under the command of Captain John Mason, RN (died 5 February 1691). On 21 July 1690, she was under the command of Captain Stephen Woolgate, RN, who died later in 1690. In 1692 Captain Thomas Symonds, RN took command. She was at the Battle of Barfleur as a member of Blue Squadron from 19 to 24 May 1692. She was with the Smyrna convoy in June 1693. She sailed with Neville's squadron to the West Indies in 1694. Captain David Wavell, RN took command on 15 February 1694 for service in Berkeley's squadron in 1694. She was off the Irish coast during 1694 thru 1697. She was rerated as a 24-gun Fifth Rate on 23 May 1695. Her gunarmament was increased to two 9-pounders on her lower deck (LD) with eighteen 6-pounders on her upper deck (UD) and four 4-pounders on her quarterdeck (QD) with an increase in manning to 115 officers and men. In 1697 Captain John Guy, RN took command for service in the West Indies. After the death of Captain Guy on 9 December 1697, Captain Christopher Colson took command. After the death of Captain Colson Captain Jedediah Barker took command. There was an attempted mutiny in 1600. She returned home and paid off in 1700. In 1701 she was dismantled for rebuilding.

Rebuild at Limehouse 1701 - 1702
She was ordered to be rebuilt on 9 October 1701 by Newman & Graves of Limehouse. Her approved launching date was 28 August 1702. The tonnage calculation would be  tons. Her gun armament would be unchanged.

Commissioned Service after Rebuild
She was commissioned in June 1702 under the command of Captain George Camocke, RN for the Irish coast. In concert with HMS Shoreham she took the privateers L'Adventure on 30 July 1705 and La Bonne-Francoise on 19 June 1706. She recaptured the sloop Wolf on 1 June 1708. She took the privateers La Marie-Therese on 13 July 1708 and La Mignonne on 20 June 1709. In November 1710 she was under command of Captain Philip Vanburgh, RN still assigned to the Irish Sea. She under went a middling repair at Portsmouth from November 1712 to February 1713 costing £1,118.7.d. Upon completion she deployed to Barbados. She returned to Home Waters and was docked at Deptford in 1715. She was ordered to be rebuilt as a sixth rate by Admiralty Order (AO) 17 December 1715. Her dismantling commenced in November 1715.

Rebuild as Sixth Rate 1716
She was ordered to be rebuilt on 17 December 1715 at Deptford Dockyard under the guidance of Master Shipwright Richard Stacey. She was launched on 27 March 1716. The tonnage calculation would be  tons. Her gun armament would be reduce to twenty 6-pounder 19 hundredweight (CWT) guns on wooden trucks on the upper deck (UD). She was completed for sea on 27 July 1716 at a cost of £2,465.19.d.

Commissioned Service as a Sixth Rate
She was commissioned in June 1716 under the command of Captain George Clinton. RN for the Mediterranean. In December 1716 Captain Robert Man, RN took command for service off Sale, Morocco. She was ordered Home in December 1718 to pay off. She was converted to a bomb-vessel by Admiralty Order (AO) 9 July 1719 for £3,220.14.11d between June and August 1719. She recommissioned in 1720 under Captain Joseph Watts, RN for service in the Baltic.

Disposition
HMS Speedwell was wrecked on the Dutch coast on 21 November 1720.

Notes

Citations

References
 Winfield 2009, British Warships in the Age of Sail (1603 – 1714), by Rif Winfield, published by Seaforth Publishing, England © 2009, EPUB 
 Chapter 5, Fifth Rates, 1689 Programme "Fireships", Speedwell
 Chapter 5, Fifth Rates, Rebuilt Fireships, Speedwell
 Chapter 6, The Sixth Rates, Vessels acquired from 2 May 1660, Gibraltar Group, Speedwell
 Winfield 2007, British Warships in the Age of Sail (1714 – 1792), by Rif Winfield, published by Seaforth Publishing, England © 2007, EPUB , Chapter 6, Sixth Rates, Sixth Rates of 20 or 24 guns, Vessels in Service at 1 August 1714, Gibraltar Group, Speedwell
 Colledge, Ships of the Royal Navy, by J.J. Colledge, revised and updated by Lt Cdr Ben Warlow and Steve Bush, published by Seaforth Publishing, Barnsley, Great Britain, © 2020, EPUB , (EPUB), Section S (Speedwell)

 

1690s ships
Corvettes of the Royal Navy
Ships built in Portsmouth
Naval ships of the United Kingdom